Paul Brodie,  (April 10, 1934 – November 19, 2007) was a Canadian saxophonist, pupil of Marcel Mule. In 1994, he was made an Officer of the Order of Canada, Canada's highest civilian honour, for having "shown true mastery of his art through his ability to reach all ages with his music".

Since 1960, he performed over 3000 concerts in Canada, United States, Mexico, France, England, India, Singapore, Hong Kong, the Philippines, Israel, Australia, China, Italy, Scotland, Russia and Argentina (1998). He is a very heavily recorded concert saxophonist - with 50 albums recorded for Golden Crest Records, CBC International Service, CBC  Enterprise, Truly Fine Records, Classic Edition, Music Minus One, China Records, Dinant Records, and ROI Records (Hong Kong).

Warren Beatty featured his saxophone playing on the soundtrack of his Academy Award-winning film Heaven Can Wait. He was also included on Clyde Gilmour's Favourites, an album celebrating Clyde Gilmour's 25 years on one of the most famous programs ever heard on CBC Radio. Brodie has appeared as a soloist with most of the leading orchestras in Canada and has often been featured on CBC Radio, CBC Stereo, CBC Television, CTV and Global. In 1980, he commissioned Ben Steinberg to write Suite Sephardi for him.

He is the author of A Student's Guide to the Saxophone, as well as three books of  saxophone solos published by Frederick Harris Music. In 1969, Brodie co-founded with Eugene Rousseau, another pupil of Marcel Mule, the World Saxophone Congress and he has been an artist/clinician for The Selmer Company of the US for over 30 years.

Discography
LPs
Paul Brodie – A Saxophone Concert (RE 7090) [1979]
Paul Brodie – Baroque and Classical Music for Soprano Saxophone (RE 7041) [1971]
Paul Brodie – Clinician Series (CRS 1010)
Paul Brodie – Encores! (RE 7102) [1982]
Paul Brodie – Koechlin Etudes for Alto Saxophone and Piano (CE 16) [1974]
Paul Brodie – More Encores! (RE 7103) [1982]
Paul Brodie – Mr. Saxophone and the Three Bears (CRS 31057)
Paul Brodie – Music Minus One, Vol. 1 (MMO 8021) [1973]
Paul Brodie – Music Minus One, Vol. 2 (MMO 8023) [1973]
Paul Brodie – Music Minus One, Vol. 3 (MMO 8025) [1973]
Paul Brodie – Music Minus One, Vol. 4 (MMO 8027) [1973]
Paul Brodie – Paul Brodie & Myriam Shechter (RE 7037)
Paul Brodie – Paul Brodie and Camerata (CRS 4194) [1980]
Paul Brodie – Paul Brodie Plays Alto and Soprano Saxophone (RE 7056) [1974]
Paul Brodie – Paul Brodie Plays Sopranino and Soprano Saxophone (RE 7049) [1972]
Paul Brodie – Paul Brodie Salutes Olde-Tyme Fiddle Music (ATF 016)
Paul Brodie – Soprano Saxophone and Harp (TF 020) [1988]
Paul Brodie – The Golden Age of the Saxophone (MVC 1005) [1983]
Paul Brodie – The Saxophone in Concert ([S]W 6066, RE 7028) [1964, 1968]
Paul Brodie – Unaccompanied Saxophone (RE 7071) [1977]
Paul Brodie Saxophone Quartet – A Recital with the Paul Brodie Saxophone Quartet (CRSQ 4143)
Paul Brodie Saxophone Quartet – The Paul Brodie Saxophone Quartet in Concert (CRSQ 4164)
Paul Brodie Saxophone Quartet – The Paul Brodie Saxophone Quartet (CRSQ 4131)
Paul Brodie Saxophone Quartet – The Paul Brodie Saxophone Quartet on Tour (CRSQ 4154)
Paul Brodie, James Campbell - Sonatas [1974]
Paul Brodie, James Campbell - Three for All [1982]
Paul Brodie, Jean-Marie Londeix – Duets for Saxophone (RE 7062) [1975]
CDs
Paul Brodie – Amigos: Saxophone and Guitar [2004]
Paul Brodie – Back to the ‘20s [1994]
Paul Brodie – Bel Canto [2012]
Paul Brodie – Paul Brodie and Friends [1990]
Paul Brodie – Paul Brodie Salutes Olde-Tyme Fiddle Music [2000]
Paul Brodie – The Golden Age of the Saxophone [1991]
Paul Brodie – The Music of Srul Irving Glick [1996]
Paul Brodie Saxophone Quartet – The Paul Brodie Saxophone Quartet, Vol. 1 [1992]
Paul Brodie Saxophone Quartet – The Paul Brodie Saxophone Quartet, Vol. 2 [1992]
James Campbell (feat. Paul Brodie) - Crossroads [2012]

References

External links
 Paul Brodie  at the Canadian Encyclopedia
 Paul Brodie at Encode

1934 births
2007 deaths
20th-century classical musicians
20th-century saxophonists
20th-century Canadian male musicians
Canadian classical musicians
Classical saxophonists
Canadian saxophonists
Male saxophonists
Musicians from Montreal
Officers of the Order of Canada